Bishop of Portsmouth may refer to:

 Bishop of Portsmouth (Anglican), a bishop of the established Church of England.
 Bishop of Portsmouth (Catholic), the Roman Catholic bishop.